Craig Edwards (born May 19, 1955) is a former professional tennis player from the United States.

Biography
Edwards, a relative late comer to tennis, changed his approach to the sport after attending a basketball camp run by John Wooden, which he attended to learn things that he could put towards his tennis. He was the No. 1 player at Ventura High School for two and a half years, then in 1974 began as a freshman at the University of Redlands. An All-American at Redlands in 1973-74 and 1974-75, he later went to Pepperdine University.

During the 1980s, Edwards competed professionally on the Grand Prix tennis circuit, primarily in doubles events. His regular partner was Eddie Edwards, a South African player of no relation, who played with him at Pepperdine. They won a Grand Prix title at Bournemouth in 1980 and were runners-up in a further two Grand Prix tournaments, at Adelaide and Stuttgart the following year. In Grand Slam competition, the pair made the semi-finals of the 1980 Australian Open and lost a match deciding tiebreak to top seeds Peter McNamara and Paul McNamee to miss out on a spot in the final. They earned seedings at subsequent Grand Slam tournaments, including the 1981 Wimbledon Championships. The pair performed well again at the 1981 Australian Open and were quarter-finalists. In singles, Edwards competed in the main draw at the 1981 US Open (first round loss to Roscoe Tanner) and 1982 Australian Open (first round loss to David Pate).

A family friend of the Bryan brothers, Edwards was a travelling coach for Bob and Mike Bryan in their early years on tour.

Grand Prix career finals

Doubles: 3 (1–2)

Challenger titles

Doubles: (1)

References

External links
 
 

1955 births
Living people
American male tennis players
American tennis coaches
Pepperdine Waves men's tennis players
Tennis players from Los Angeles
Redlands Bulldogs men's tennis players